The 2001 ICC Africa Under-19 Championship was a cricket tournament held in Uganda from 5–9 January 2001. All matches were played in the capital Kampala.

The tournament was a round-robin, with five teams playing each other once. Namibia finished first, ahead of a combined East and Central Africa side, and consequently qualified for the 2002 Under-19 World Cup in New Zealand. Tanzanian batsman Utpal Patel, playing for East and Central Africa, led the tournament in runs scored. Three players, Kenya's Alfred Luseno, Namibia's Michael Durant, and Nigeria's O. Animashaun (playing for West Africa), led the tournament in wickets taken, with nine apiece.

The tournament was the inaugural edition of the ICC Africa Under-19 Championships, which provide a direct qualification route to the Under-19 World Cup for African Cricket Association members. Two other African teams, South Africa and Zimbabwe, are full members of the International Cricket Council (ICC) and thus qualify automatically. Another edition of the tournament was not held until 2007. Instead, a joint tournament was organised with ICC East Asia-Pacific teams, held on two occasions (in 2003 and 2005).

Teams and qualification 
Two combined regional teams, East and Central Africa and West Africa, participated in the championship for the first and only time, respectively organised by the East and Central Africa Cricket Conference and the West Africa Cricket Council. Players from Malawi, Tanzania, and Zambia were eligible for East and Central Africa, while players from The Gambia, Ghana, Nigeria, and Sierra Leone were eligible for West Africa.

Preparation

Table

Source: CricketArchive

Statistics

Most runs
The top five run scorers are included in this table, ranked by runs scored and then by batting average.

Source: CricketArchive

Most wickets

The top five wicket takers are listed in this table, ranked by wickets taken and then by bowling average.

Source: CricketArchive

References 

Under-19 regional cricket tournaments
Sport in Kampala
International cricket competitions in 2000–01
2001 in Ugandan cricket
International cricket competitions in Uganda